Gordon Murray (3 May 1921 – 30 June 2016) was a British television producer and puppeteer. He created and wrote some of the most repeated children's television programmes ever seen in Britain. Camberwick Green, Trumpton,  and Chigley, collectively known as the Trumptonshire Trilogy, were all made by the company he founded.

Early life and television career
Murray was educated at Emanuel School, Battersea, London. Murray was always interested in puppets, as a child he made puppets and used to give little shows to friends and family at home. Speaking in 1999 he said, "I have been interested in puppets ever since I was a child. My enthusiasm was greatly stimulated, I remember, by a visit to the Victoria Palace when I was about eight to see Delvain's Marionettes on the variety bill. Later, of course, I avidly read the Whanslaw books." On leaving school, he worked as a journalist and also joined the Territorial Army. He enlisted in the London Scottish Regiment in 1939 and was later commissioned into the Royal Corps of Signals. He saw action at the D-Day landings, landing on Gold Beach.
 
After being demobbed at the end of the Second World War, he worked in repertory theatre, where he met ballet dancer Enid Martin, whom he later married. They had two daughters. In 1950, Murray set up his own puppet company, Murray's Marionettes. Following an invitation to BBC producer Freda Lingstrom to one of his shows he was offered work, operating Spotty Dog in The Woodentops (TV series). Murray then became a producer in the BBC children's department, producing Sketch Club and Captain Pugwash. Initially the shows he worked on went out live but frustrated by the hit and miss approach of live work, he developed his own film studio and shot his own films. In 1958 he created the series A Rubovian Legend, which ran until 1963, with fellow puppeteers John Hardwick and Bob Bura who he would work with over the following twenty years.

Trumptonshire years

After the BBC Children's Department and Women's Programmes merged in 1964, he left the BBC to form an independent production company, Gordon Murray Puppets Productions, based in a converted church in Crouch End, North London.,

Here he made The Trumptonshire Trilogy: Camberwick Green which broadcast in 1966 (the first children's programme in colour on the BBC), Trumpton in 1967 and Chigley in 1969. (Murray had originally named 'Camberwick Green' 'Candlewick Green', but then found the name had been misspelled on the contract: however, he did not mind, as he liked the new title and was in need of money, so he simply signed the contract). Murray would create the vehicles, puppets and scripts to the studio and Bura and Hardwick would animate them. Realising that the string-based marionettes used previously would look old-fashioned, he looked to Eastern Europe for the stop motion animation technique he would use.

One far-sighted contribution by Bura and Hardwick was their insistence on shooting Camberwick Green in both black-and-white and colour. Only Chigley first went out after BBC 1 adopted broadcasting in colour, but their decision meant that the programmes were broadcast regularly for longer than might otherwise have been the case.

Following Chigley, in 1969 it was six years before Murray had a new series on television, a stop-motion remake of The Rubovian Legends called just Rubovia. His next work was Skip and Fuffy, which was broadcast within Multi-Coloured Swap Shop in 1978; his final series, The Gublins, was broadcast in 1979.

After television
After retiring from animation, he produced and self-marketed more than thirty-four different limited-edition miniature books under the Silver Thimble Books imprint. Bound entirely by hand they contained miniature watercolour paintings, special embroidered covers and bindings, and slip cases. A complete set of these books is held in the Charlotte M. Smith Collection of Miniature Books in the library of the University of Iowa.

In the 1980s, he burnt all the remaining puppets and sets, except for one soldier from Camberwick Green that escaped the fire. It was given by his eldest daughter to a friend who kept it in a shoe box. It was later auctioned by Christie's in May 2003 but failed to meet the reserve price.

A 2009 poll by Channel 4 television ranked Trumpton as the 22nd most popular children's television show.
Murray's work was later revived, in a series of television adverts for Porridge Oats, and also in adverts for bread in 1988. His puppets were used most recently in the cult BBC drama Life on Mars, in a scene where the character Sam Tyler is hallucinating.

In January 2012, all 39 original episodes of the Trumptonshire trilogy were digitally restored after Murray found some boxes of original footage of the series in his attic at home and handed them over to the BBC for restoration.

His wife Enid having predeceased him, Murray died on 30 June 2016, at the age of 95.

Selected filmography
 Captain Pugwash – 1957
 A Rubovian Legend – 1958
  Sketch Club – 1958
 Camberwick Green – 1966
 Trumpton – 1967
 Chigley – 1969
 Rubovia – 1976
 The Gublins – 1979

References

External links

Realm of Rubovia: The Official Gordon Murray Rubovian Legends website
Biography of Gordon Murray
The Trumptonshire Trilogy
Trumptonshire web

The Story of Watch With Mother
Silver Thimble Books Bibliography

1921 births
2016 deaths
Military personnel from London
English people of Scottish descent
British animators
British children's writers
British puppeteers
British television producers
British animated film directors
British animated film producers
People educated at Emanuel School
London Scottish soldiers
British Army personnel of World War II
Royal Corps of Signals officers